Hedvig Hricak was born in 1946, in Zagreb, SR Croatia, SFR Yugoslavia and earned her MD degree from the School of Medicine, University of Zagreb in 1970. She has been Chairman of the Department of Radiology, Memorial Sloan-Kettering Cancer Center since November 1999. She is professor of radiology at the Weill Medical College of Cornell University.

Biography
Hricak earned her medical degree from the School of Medicine, University of Zagreb in 1970. In 1982 Hricak joined the faculty of University of California, San Francisco (UCSF), where she became professor of radiology, radiation oncology, urology and gynecology. While at UCSF, she earned her Dr. Med. Sc./Ph.D. from the Karolinska Institute in Stockholm, Sweden. In 1999, she became chairman of the Department of Radiology at Memorial Sloan Kettering Cancer Center (MSK). Hricak's past roles include as the president, Radiological Society of North America, 2009-2010

In June 2021, Hricak chaired the National Academies committee that wrote the report endorsing NASA's proposal to revise current radiation exposure limits for astronauts. This would set a single, lifetime limit of allowable exposure for astronauts, rather than keeping limits based on age and gender.

References

External links 
The Hedvig Hricak Lab
Breast Cancer Research Foundation

1946 births
Living people
American radiologists
Yugoslav emigrants to the United States
Scientists from Zagreb
School of Medicine, University of Zagreb alumni
Foreign Members of the Russian Academy of Sciences
Women radiologists
Members of the National Academy of Medicine